Pornic (Pornizh in Breton, Port-Nitz in Gallo) is a commune in the Loire-Atlantique department in western France.

In 1973 the commune of Pornic absorbed the neighbouring municipalities of Sainte-Marie-sur-Mer and Clion-sur-Mer.

Population

Sights
Château de Pornic; medieval castle

Breton language
The municipality launched a linguistic plan through Ya d'ar brezhoneg on 1 March  2006.

Transport
The Pornic train station is served by trains to Nantes and Sainte-Pazanne.

Twin towns
 Scalby, North Yorkshire - since 1995
 Linz am Rhein, Germany - since 1995
 Baiona, Spain - since 1995

Climate
Pornic has a Csb type climate (Mediterranean with mild summers). The highest temperature recorded in Pornic is 38.1 °C on 4 August 2003, while the lowest temperature was -11.2 °C on 2 February 1986. Pornic's average temperature between 1971 and 2000 is approximately 12.8 °C.

See also
 Communes of the Loire-Atlantique department
 Sainte-Marie-sur-Mer

References

Communes of Loire-Atlantique

Pornic Agglo Pays de Retz
Populated coastal places in France